The 38th Chess Olympiad, organized by FIDE and comprising an open and a women's tournament, as well as several other events designed to promote the game of chess, took place from 12 to 25 November 2008 in Dresden, Germany. There were 146 teams in the open event and 111 in the women's event. In total, 1277 players were registered.

Both tournament sections were officiated by international arbiter Ignatius Leong (Singapore). In a change from recent Olympiads, the number of rounds of the Swiss system were reduced from 13 to 11 with accelerated pairings. For the first time, the women's division, like the open division, was played over four boards per round, with each team allowed one alternate for a total of five players. In another first, the final rankings were determined by match points, not game points. In the event of a draw, the tie-break was decided by 1. Deducted Sonneborn-Berger; 2. Deducted sum of match points; 3. Game points.

The time control for each game permitted each player 90 minutes their first 40 moves and 30 minutes for the rest of the game, with an additional 30 seconds increment for each player after each move, beginning with the first. As a new rule, no draws by agreement were permitted before 30 moves had been completed. Yet there were games drawn as soon as the 16th move, formally drawn by repetition against which there was no rule. In addition, players who were not present at the board at the commencement of a round automatically forfeited the game. This rule was implemented to align chess with other sports events.

Open event

The open division was contested by 146 teams representing 141 nations. Germany, as hosts, fielded three teams, whilst the International Braille Chess Association (IBCA), the International Physically Disabled Chess Association (IPCA), and the International Committee of Silent Chess (ICSC) each provided one squad. Morocco were signed up, but never appeared for their first round match and were disqualified.

Defending champions Armenia, once again led by Levon Aronian, clinched their second consecutive title. Despite being seeded only eighth, they won nine out of eleven matches, drew against fourth-placed Ukraine and lost only (1½-2½) to runners-up Israel, captained by Boris Gelfand. The Israelis finished one point behind Armenia. The United States, led by Gata Kamsky, took the bronze medals on a better tie break score than Vasyl Ivanchuk and the rest of the Ukrainian team after defeating Ukraine (3½-½) in the last round.

Once again, the Russian team under captain Vladimir Kramnik were the pre-tournament favourites but finished disappointingly in fifth place. Kramnik, having recently lost a world championship match, performed well below his rating, as did the rest of the team, except alternate Dmitry Yakovenko who won the reserve board.

Arguably the biggest surprise of the tournament was Vietnam, who weren't even seeded in the top 30, but still managed to finish in ninth place, aided somewhat by the new tournament structure which allotted them some weaker opponents, although they did manage a 2-2 result against China. The German hosts finished 13th, while India, without World Champion Viswanathan Anand, had to settle for 16th place.

{| class="wikitable"
|+ Open event results, #1–#10
! # !! Country !! Players !! Averagerating !! MP !! dSB
|-
| style="background:gold;"|1 ||  || Aronian, Akopian, Sargissian, Petrosian, Minasian || 2677 || 19 || 
|-
| style="background:silver;"|2 ||  || Gelfand, Roiz, Avrukh, Postny, Rodshtein || 2682 || 18 || 
|-
| style="background:#cc9966;"|3 ||  || Kamsky, Nakamura, Onischuk, Shulman, Akobian || 2673 || 17 || 362.0
|-
| 4 ||  || Ivanchuk, Karjakin, Eljanov, Efimenko, Volokitin || 2729 || 17 || 348.5
|-
| 5 ||  || Kramnik, Svidler, Grischuk, Morozevich, Yakovenko || 2756 || 16 || 375.0
|-
| 6 ||  || Radjabov, Mamedyarov, Gashimov, Guseinov, Mamedov || 2709 || 16 || 359.5
|-
| 7 ||  || Wang Yue, Bu Xiangzhi, Ni Hua, Wang Hao, Li Chao || 2714 || 16 || 357.5
|-
| 8 ||  || Lékó, Polgár, Almási, Balogh, Berkes || 2692 || 16 || 341.5
|-
| 9 ||  || Nguyễn Ngọc Trường Sơn, Lê Quang Liêm,Đào Thiên Hải, Nguyễn Văn Huy, Tu Hoang Thong || 2539 || 16 || 340.0
|-
| 10 ||  || Shirov, Vallejo Pons, Illescas Córdoba,Khamrakulov, San Segundo Carrillo || 2644 || 16 || 337.5
|}
{| class="wikitable collapsible collapsed"
|+ class="nowrap" |Open event results, #11–end (#146)
! Rank !! Country !! Averagerating !! MP !! dSB !! dSMP
|-
| 11 ||  || 2618 || 16 || 321.0 || 
|-
| 12 ||  || 2609 || 15 || 343.0 || 
|-
| 13 ||  || 2647 || 15 || 339.0 || 
|-
| 14 ||  || 2691 || 15 || 327.5 || 
|-
| 15 ||  || 2629 || 15 || 320.0 || 
|-
| 16 ||  || 2634 || 15 || 310.0 || 
|-
| 17 ||  || 2583 || 15 || 288.0 || 
|-
| 18 ||  || 2602 || 14 || 307.0 || 
|-
| 19 ||  || 2631 || 14 || 306.5 || 
|-
| 20 ||  || 2604 || 14 || 302.0 || 
|-
| 21 ||  || 2611 || 14 || 300.0 || 
|-
| 22 ||  || 2690 || 14 || 295.0 || 
|-
| 23 ||  || 2626 || 14 || 294.5 || 
|-
| 24 ||  || 2585 || 14 || 292.5 || 
|-
| 25 ||  || 2576 || 14 || 286.0 || 
|-
| 26 ||  || 2522 || 14 || 279.0 || 
|-
| 27 ||  || 2588 || 14 || 275.5 || 
|-
| 28 ||  || 2500 || 14 || 272.5 || 
|-
| 29 ||  || 2609 || 13 || 301.0 || 
|-
| 30 ||  || 2577 || 13 || 294.0 || 
|-
| 31 ||  || 2587 || 13 || 290.0 || 
|-
| 32 ||  || 2491 || 13 || 287.5 || 
|-
| 33 ||  || 2495 || 13 || 282.0 || 
|-
| 34 ||  || 2548 || 13 || 278.0 || 
|-
| 35 ||  "C" || 2506 || 13 || 276.5 || 122
|-
| 36 ||  || 2496 || 13 || 276.5 || 121
|-
| 37 ||  || 2555 || 13 || 272.5 || 
|-
| 38 ||  || 2611 || 13 || 270.5 || 
|-
| 39 ||  || 2566 || 13 || 268.5 || 
|-
| 40 ||  || 2524 || 13 || 265.0 || 
|-
| 41 ||  || 2521 || 13 || 261.0 || 
|-
| 42 ||  "B" || 2523 || 13 || 259.0 || 
|-
| 43 ||  || 2585 || 13 || 258.5 || 
|-
| 44 ||  || 2522 || 13 || 257.5 || 
|-
| 45 ||  || 2486 || 13 || 252.5 || 
|-
| 46 ||  || 2526 || 13 || 250.0 || 
|-
| 47 ||  || 2486 || 13 || 249.0 || 
|-
| 48 ||  || 2415 || 13 || 220.5 || 
|-
| 49 ||  || 2459 || 12 || 257.0 || 
|-
| 50 ||  || 2557 || 12 || 256.5 || 
|-
| 51 ||  || 2541 || 12 || 251.0 || 
|-
| 52 ||  || 2387 || 12 || 249.5 || 
|-
| 53 ||  || 2512 || 12 || 249.0 || 
|-
| 54 ||  || 2460 || 12 || 240.0 || 
|-
| 55 ||  || 2441 || 12 || 237.5 || 
|-
| 56 ||  || 2497 || 12 || 232.0 || 
|-
| 57 ||  || 2488 || 12 || 222.5 || 
|-
| 58 ||  || 2315 || 12 || 220.5 || 
|-
| 59 ||  || 2525 || 12 || 220.0 || 
|-
| 60 ||  || 2452 || 12 || 218.5 || 
|-
| 61 ||  || 2364 || 12 || 213.5 || 
|-
| 62 ||  || 2352 || 12 || 210.5 || 
|-
| 63 ||  || 2332 || 12 || 191.0 || 
|-
| 64 ||  || 2420 || 11 || 246.0 || 
|-
| 65 ||  || 2031 || 11 || 234.5 || 
|-
| 66 ||  || 2400 || 11 || 225.5 || 
|-
| 67 ||  || 2444 || 11 || 224.5 || 
|-
| 68 ||  || 2403 || 11 || 223.5 || 
|-
| 69 ||  || 2572 || 11 || 221.5 || 
|-
| 70 ||  || 2395 || 11 || 215.5 || 
|-
| 71 ||  || 2358 || 11 || 207.0 || 
|-
| 72 ||  || 2408 || 11 || 206.0 || 
|-
| 73 ||  || 2372 || 11 || 188.5 || 
|-
| 74 ||  || 2423 || 11 || 188.0 || 
|-
| 75 ||  || 2286 || 11 || 177.5 || 
|-
| 76 ||  || 2288 || 11 || 175.5 || 
|-
| 77 ||  || 2206 || 11 || 174.5 || 
|-
| 78 ||  || 2300 || 11 || 173.5 || 
|-
| 79 || ICSC || 2305 || 11 || 166.5 || 
|-
| 80 ||  || 2217 || 11 || 165.0 || 
|-
| 81 ||  || 2263 || 11 || 158.0 || 
|-
| 82 ||  || 2337 || 10 || 222.5 || 
|-
| 83 ||  || 2355 || 10 || 200.5 || 
|-
| 84 ||  || 2312 || 10 || 192.5 || 
|-
| 85 ||  || 2290 || 10 || 188.5 || 
|-
| 86 ||  || 2313 || 10 || 183.5 || 
|-
| 87 ||  || 2263 || 10 || 182.5 || 
|-
| 88 || IPCA || 2358 || 10 || 178.5 || 
|-
| 89 ||  || 2340 || 10 || 174.0 || 
|-
| 90 ||  || 2358 || 10 || 167.5 || 
|-
| 91 || IBCA || 2318 || 10 || 166.0 || 
|-
| 92 ||  || 2102 || 10 || 162.5 || 
|-
| 93 ||  || 2206 || 10 || 161.0 || 
|-
| 94 ||  || 2169 || 10 || 160.0 || 
|-
| 95 ||  || 2228 || 10 || 159.0 || 
|-
| 96 ||  || 2362 || 10 || 157.5 || 
|-
| 97 ||  || 2370 || 10 || 152.0 || 
|-
| 98 ||  || 2231 || 10 || 151.5 || 
|-
| 99 ||  || 2312 || 10 || 150.5 || 
|-
| 100 ||  || 2272 || 10 || 140.5 || 
|-
| 101 ||  || 2306 || 9 || 177.5 || 
|-
| 102 ||  || 1988 || 9 || 174.0 || 
|-
| 103 ||  || 2185 || 9 || 173.0 || 
|-
| 104 ||  || 2275 || 9 || 171.0 || 
|-
| 105 ||  || 2310 || 9 || 163.5 || 
|-
| 106 ||  || 2332 || 9 || 163.5 || 
|-
| 107 ||  || 2095 || 9 || 152.0 || 
|-
| 108 ||  || 2022 || 9 || 148.0 || 
|-
| 109 ||  || 2068 || 9 || 146.5 || 
|-
| 110 ||  || 2256 || 9 || 144.0 || 
|-
| 111 ||  || 2145 || 9 || 141.0 || 
|-
| 112 ||  || 2168 || 9 || 135.5 || 
|-
| 113 ||  || 2177 || 9 || 134.0 || 
|-
| 114 ||  || 2287 || 9 || 130.5 || 
|-
| 115 ||  || 1742 || 9 || 127.0 || 
|-
| 116 ||  || 2238 || 9 || 120.0 || 
|-
| 117 ||  || 2082 || 8 || 140.5 || 
|-
| 118 ||  || 2142 || 8 || 136.0 || 
|-
| 119 ||  || 1775 || 8 || 132.0 || 
|-
| 120 ||  || 2175 || 8 || 126.0 || 
|-
| 121 ||  || 1907 || 8 || 124.5 || 
|-
| 122 ||  || 2144 || 8 || 120.0 || 
|-
| 123 ||  || 1937 || 8 || 116.5 || 
|-
| 124 ||  || 1769 || 8 || 108.0 || 
|-
| 125 ||  || 2173 || 8 || 106.5 || 
|-
| 126 ||  || 2055 || 8 || 97.0 || 
|-
| 127 ||  || 1952 || 8 || 95.5 || 
|-
| 128 ||  || 1968 || 7 || 129.0 || 
|-
| 129 ||  || 2139 || 7 || 116.0 || 
|-
| 130 ||  || 2141 || 7 || 110.0 || 
|-
| 131 ||  || 2164 || 7 || 109.0 || 
|-
| 132 ||  || 2023 || 7 || 106.0 || 
|-
| 133 ||  || 1896 || 7 || 94.5 || 
|-
| 134 ||  || 2020 || 7 || 94.0 || 
|-
| 135 ||  || 2034 || 7 || 92.0 || 
|-
| 136 ||  || 1846 || 7 || 85.0 || 
|-
| 137 ||  || 1978 || 7 || 81.0 || 
|-
| 138 ||  || 1400 || 6 || 116.5 || 
|-
| 139 ||  || 2086 || 6 || 88.0 || 
|-
| 140 ||  || 1400 || 6 || 77.0 || 
|-
| 141 ||  || 1400 || 6 || 43.0 || 
|-
| 142 ||  || 1400 || 5 || 87.0 || 
|-
| 143 ||  || 1923 || 5 || 73.0 || 
|-
| 144 ||  || 1710 || 5 || 68.5 || 
|-
| 145 ||  || 1400 || 4 ||  || 
|-
| 146 ||  || 1608 || 3 ||  || 
|}

Group prizes

In addition to the overall medals, prizes were given out to the best teams in five different seeding groups—in other words, the teams who exceeded their seeding the most. Overall medal winners were not eligible for group prizes.

{| class="wikitable"
|+ Group Prizes
! Group !! Seedingrange !! Team !! MP !! dSB
|-
| A || 1–29 ||  || 17 || 348.5
|-
| B || 30–58 ||  || 16 || 340.0
|-
| C || 59–87 ||  || 13 || 220.5
|-
| D || 88–116 ||  || 11 || 177.5
|-
| E || 117–146 ||  || 11 || 234.5
|}

Individual medals

For the first time, all board prizes were given out according to performance ratings. Accordingly, there was no overall prize, although Sargissian on the third board had the best performance of all players at the tournament:

 Board 1:  Peter Leko 2834
 Board 2:  Vladimir Akopian 2813
 Board 3:  Gabriel Sargissian 2869
 Board 4:  Dragiša Blagojević 2792
 Reserve:  Dmitry Yakovenko 2794

Women's event

The women's division was contested by 111 teams representing 106 nations. Germany, as hosts, fielded three teams, whilst the International Braille Chess Association (IBCA), the International Physically Disabled Chess Association (IPCA), and the International Committee of Silent Chess (ICSC) each provided one squad.

Georgia won their fourth title, 12 years after the third one, narrowly defeating Ukraine on tie breaks. The two teams didn't meet during the tournament, but when the Ukrainians only drew their penultimate match against Serbia while the Georgians defeated former champions China (2½-1½), the gold was Georgia's to lose. In the last round they record a win (3-1) against the Serbian, who thus came to play a crucial role in the fight for the title, despite finishing in seventh place themselves. The Georgian team were led by former World Champion, 47-year-old Maia Chiburdanidze, who delivered a stellar performance, winning the top board with the best performance of the tournament.

The United States clinched the bronze medals on tie breaks, just ahead of Russia (with newly crowned World Champion Alexandra Kosteniuk) and Poland. The German hosts finished in 21st place.

{| class="wikitable"
|+ Women's section results, #1–#10
! # !! Country !! Players !! Averagerating !! MP !! dSB
|-
| style="background:gold;"|1 ||  || Chiburdanidze, Dzagnidze, Javakhishvili, Lomineishvili, Khukhashvili || 2476 || 18 || 411.5
|-
| style="background:silver;"|2 ||  || Lahno, Zhukova, Ushenina, Gaponenko, Zdebskaya || 2486 || 18 || 406.5
|-
| style="background:#cc9966;"|3 ||  || Krush, Zatonskih, Goletiani, Rohonyan, Abrahamyan || 2396 || 17 || 390.5
|-
| 4 ||  || Kosteniuk, T. Kosintseva, N. Kosintseva, Korbut, Pogonina || 2495 || 17 || 367.0
|-
| 5 ||  || Soćko, Rajlich, Zawadzka, Majdan, Przeździecka || 2386 || 17 || 364.5
|-
| 6 ||  || Danielian, Mkrtchian, Aginian, Galojan, Andriasian || 2397 || 16 || 353.0
|-
| 7 ||  || Marić, Bojković, Stojanović, Chelushkina, Benderać || 2386 || 16 || 318.5
|-
| 8 ||  || Hou Yifan, Zhao Xue, Shen Yang, Ju Wenjun, Tan Zhongyi || 2486 || 15 || 392.5
|-
| 9 ||  || Klinova, Borsuk, Igla, Vasiliev, Efroimski || 2304 || 15 || 325.0
|-
| 10 ||  || Sharevich, Popova, Azarova, Berlin, Klimets || 2278 || 15 || 317.5
|}
{| class="wikitable collapsible collapsed"
|+ class="nowrap" |Women's section results, #11–end (#111)
! Rank !! Country !! Averagerating !! MP !! dSB !! dSMP
|-
| 11 ||  || 2348 || 15 || 306.5 || 
|-
| 12 ||  || 2245 || 15 || 280.0 || 
|-
| 13 ||  || 2427 || 14 || 336.5 || 
|-
| 14 ||  || 2389 || 14 || 321.0 || 
|-
| 15 ||  || 2388 || 14 || 320.5 || 
|-
| 16 ||  || 2348 || 14 || 299.5 || 
|-
| 17 ||  || 2161 || 14 || 289.0 || 
|-
| 18 ||  || 2323 || 14 || 286.0 || 
|-
| 19 ||  || 2375 || 14 || 282.0 || 
|-
| 20 ||  || 2259 || 14 || 281.5 || 
|-
| 21 ||  || 2379 || 14 || 279.0 || 
|-
| 22 ||  || 2181 || 14 || 267.0 || 
|-
| 23 ||  || 2296 || 14 || 266.5 || 
|-
| 24 ||  || 2317 || 13 || 307.5 || 
|-
| 25 ||  || 2289 || 13 || 288.0 || 
|-
| 26 ||  || 2292 || 13 || 272.5 || 
|-
| 27 ||  || 2231 || 13 || 269.5 || 
|-
| 28 ||  || 2264 || 13 || 266.5 || 
|-
| 29 ||  || 2260 || 13 || 262.0 || 
|-
| 30 ||  || 2184 || 13 || 249.5 || 
|-
| 31 ||  || 2261 || 13 || 246.5 || 
|-
| 32 ||  || 2174 || 13 || 245.5 || 
|-
| 33 ||  || 2246 || 13 || 238.0 || 
|-
| 34 ||  "B" || 2159 || 13 || 236.0 || 
|-
| 35 ||  || 2242 || 13 || 227.5 || 
|-
| 36 ||  || 2321 || 12 || 270.0 || 
|-
| 37 ||  || 2359 || 12 || 260.0 || 
|-
| 38 ||  || 2317 || 12 || 258.5 || 
|-
| 39 ||  || 2194 || 12 || 258.0 || 
|-
| 40 ||  || 2210 || 12 || 257.5 || 
|-
| 41 ||  || 2179 || 12 || 255.5 || 
|-
| 42 ||  || 2021 || 12 || 237.5 || 
|-
| 43 ||  || 2134 || 12 || 232.0 || 
|-
| 44 ||  || 2185 || 12 || 227.5 || 
|-
| 45 ||  || 2240 || 12 || 226.5 || 
|-
| 46 ||  || 2145 || 12 || 218.0 || 
|-
| 47 ||  "C" || 2142 || 12 || 208.5 || 
|-
| 48 ||  || 2077 || 12 || 196.0 || 
|-
| 49 ||  || 2093 || 12 || 182.0 || 
|-
| 50 ||  || 2248 || 11 || 250.0 || 
|-
| 51 ||  || 2294 || 11 || 239.0 || 
|-
| 52 ||  || 2223 || 11 || 230.0 || 
|-
| 53 ||  || 2193 || 11 || 224.0 || 
|-
| 54 ||  || 2014 || 11 || 205.0 || 
|-
| 55 ||  || 2022 || 11 || 200.5 || 
|-
| 56 ||  || 1986 || 11 || 199.5 || 
|-
| 57 ||  || 1938 || 11 || 198.0 || 
|-
| 58 ||  || 2063 || 11 || 194.5 || 
|-
| 59 ||  || 2110 || 11 || 193.0 || 
|-
| 60 ||  || 2029 || 11 || 191.0 || 
|-
| 61 || IPCA || 2018 || 11 || 180.0 || 
|-
| 62 ||  || 1912 || 11 || 174.5 || 
|-
| 63 ||  || 2122 || 10 || 209.0 || 
|-
| 64 ||  || 2098 || 10 || 199.5 || 
|-
| 65 ||  || 2124 || 10 || 190.0 || 
|-
| 66 ||  || 2106 || 10 || 184.0 || 
|-
| 67 ||  || 2108 || 10 || 178.0 || 
|-
| 68 ||  || 1920 || 10 || 176.0 || 
|-
| 69 || IBCA || 2035 || 10 || 168.0 || 
|-
| 70 ||  || 2098 || 10 || 163.5 || 
|-
| 71 ||  || 1978 || 10 || 162.0 || 
|-
| 72 || ICSC || 2130 || 10 || 161.0 || 
|-
| 73 ||  || 1936 || 10 || 158.0 || 
|-
| 74 ||  || 2093 || 10 || 156.0 || 
|-
| 75 ||  || 1767 || 10 || 155.0 || 104
|-
| 76 ||  || 1808 || 10 || 155.0 || 96
|-
| 77 ||  || 2004 || 10 || 151.0 || 
|-
| 78 ||  || 1850 || 9 || 169.5 || 
|-
| 79 ||  || 1891 || 9 || 145.0 || 
|-
| 80 ||  || 1882 || 9 || 140.0 || 107
|-
| 81 ||  || 1870 || 9 || 140.0 || 103
|-
| 82 ||  || 1802 || 9 || 139.0 || 
|-
| 83 ||  || 1861 || 9 || 129.0 || 
|-
| 84 ||  || 1725 || 9 || 127.0 || 
|-
| 85 ||  || 1656 || 9 || 121.0 || 
|-
| 86 ||  || 1556 || 9 || 118.5 || 
|-
| 87 ||  || 1706 || 9 || 117.5 || 
|-
| 88 ||  || 1842 || 8 || 142.0 || 
|-
| 89 ||  || 1805 || 8 || 129.0 || 
|-
| 90 ||  || 1506 || 8 || 124.0 || 
|-
| 91 ||  || 1490 || 8 || 119.0 || 
|-
| 92 ||  || 1400 || 8 || 114.5 || 
|-
| 93 ||  || 1529 || 8 || 113.5 || 
|-
| 94 ||  || 1534 || 8 || 90.5 || 
|-
| 95 ||  || 1400 || 8 || 81.0 || 
|-
| 96 ||  || 1621 || 7 || 119.5 || 
|-
| 97 ||  || 1400 || 7 || 111.0 || 
|-
| 98 ||  || 1400 || 7 || 106.0 || 
|-
| 99 ||  || 1498 || 7 || 105.0 || 
|-
| 100 ||  || 1731 || 7 || 101.5 || 
|-
| 101 ||  || 1400 || 7 || 92.5 || 
|-
| 102 ||  || 1400 || 7 || 90.0 || 
|-
| 103 ||  || 1641 || 7 || 82.5 || 
|-
| 104 ||  || 1554 || 7 || 79.5 || 
|-
| 105 ||  || 1551 || 7 || 74.5 || 
|-
| 106 ||  || 1469 || 7 || 66.5 || 
|-
| 107 ||  || 1667 || 7 || 58.0 || 
|-
| 108 ||  || 1400 || 6 ||  || 
|-
| 109 ||  || 1400 || 5 ||  || 
|-
| 110 ||  || 1400 || 3 ||  || 
|-
| 111 ||  || 1400 || 1 ||  || 
|}

Individual medals

For the first time, all board prizes were given out according to performance ratings. Accordingly, there was no overall prize, although reborn ex-champion Chiburdanidze on the top board had the best performance of all players at the tournament:

 Board 1:  Maia Chiburdanidze 2715
 Board 2:  Anna Zatonskih 2571
 Board 3:  Nadezhda Kosintseva 2591
 Board 4:  Joanna Majdan 2621
 Reserve:  Natalia Zdebskaya 2528

Overall title

The Nona Gaprindashvili Trophy is awarded to the nation that has the highest total number of match points in the open and women's divisions combined. Where two or more teams are tied, they are ordered by the same tie breakers as in the two separate events.

The trophy, named after the former women's World Champion (1961–78), was created by FIDE in 1997.

Bibliography
 Harald Fietz, Josip Asik, Anna Burtasova: Olympiad United! Dresden 2008. Verlag Schach Wissen, Berlin 2009.

Notes

External links

38th Chess Olympiad: Dresden 2008 OlimpBase
Official website
Open section results
Women's section results

38
Women's Chess Olympiads
Olympiad 38
Chess Olympiad 38
Olympiad 38
Chess Olympiad 38